Walter "Ants" Atanas (December 22, 1923 – August 8, 1991) was a Canadian ice hockey right winger. He played for the New York Rangers during the 1944-45 season, appearing in 49 games totalling 21 points. Much of his career was spent in the minor leagues, in particular the American Hockey League and the United States Hockey League.

He worked as a scout for the Philadelphia Flyers from 1972 until his death.

Career statistics

External links

1923 births
1991 deaths
Canadian ice hockey right wingers
Ice hockey people from Ontario
New York Rangers players
Philadelphia Flyers scouts
Sportspeople from Hamilton, Ontario